Reagan EP is a single by Whirlwind Heat, released on April 10, 2006 by Brille.

Track listing
 Reagan
 Memory
 Macho Man
 I Fucked Up Reagan

2006 EPs
Whirlwind Heat EPs